Club de Deportes Iquique S.A.D.P. is a Chilean football club based in Iquique that is a current member of the Primera B. Founded in 1978, the club's home stadium is the Estadio Tierra de Campeones, which has a 13,171 capacity.

Iquique has spent 19 seasons in the Primera División, its longest spell lasting ten years (1980–90). The team has spent 13 seasons in Primera B and four in the third-tier Tercera División. Among its titles, Iquique has won three Copa Chile titles (1980, 2010 and 2013–14).

They have a local rivalry with San Marcos de Arica, disputing the derby since early 1980s.

History
The team was founded on 21 May 1978 by the merger of Cavancha and Estrella de Chile. The following year Iquique competed in the Segunda División, winning it and securing promotion to the Campeonato Nacional.

In its first season at top level, the club finished in 14th place out of eighteen teams and won the Copa Polla Gol, beating Colo-Colo in the final at the Estadio Nacional.

Between 1981 and 1987, Iquique remained in mid-table positions. In 1988, they reached the qualifying stages of the 1989 Copa Libertadores after finishing in third place in the league. However, they lost to Colo-Colo in the final of the qualification tournament. That season, Juan José Oré was the tournament's leading goalscorer with eighteen goals.

In 1991, following a poor campaign where the team finished in the bottom of the table, they were relegated to the second division. They returned to the top flight for one season in 1993, and again for two seasons in 1997. However, in 2002, the club was relegated to the third division and then declared bankruptcy. It was relaunched as Municipal Iquique.

During its four-year presence in the third division, the club saw the rise of Chilean international Edson Puch, a key player in their title win of 2006. Two years later, Iquique reached its fourth promotion to the top division, beating Coquimbo Unido in the promotion playoffs. During the 2009 Apertura, Puch was transferred to Universidad de Chile and Cristian Bogado to Colo-Colo. The club only obtained nine points during the second half of the season, and finished bottom of the table to be relegated to the second division.

In 2010, Iquique won its third second division title and its second Copa Chile title, securing qualification for the 2011 Copa Sudamericana. In their first ever continental tournament, the club was eliminated in the preliminary stage by Universidad Católica. The team finished eleventh in the league.

In 2012, Iquique participated in the Copa Sudamericana for the second consecutive time, qualifying with third place in the 2012 Apertura which saw the return of Puch and Bogado, signings including Rodrigo Díaz and the emergence of Álvaro Ramos as a strong player. However, once again the team were eliminated at the preliminary stage, this time by Uruguay's Nacional after a 4–2 aggregate loss. That season, the club qualified for the Copa Libertadores after finishing third in the league. After beating Mexican side León in the first stage, Iquique finished bottom of their group in the next stage.

In 2014, Iquique won its third Copa Chile, qualifying again for the Copa Sudamericana. For the third time, it was eliminated at the preliminary stage, with a loss to Universitario de Sucre from Bolivia. In the 2014–15 season, Católica lost the title to Cobresal on the final matchday after drawing 3–3 with Iquique, after Iquique had been losing 3–0 at half time. During the 2015–16 season they finished tenth in the annual table.

Stadium

The Estadio Municipal de Cavancha is currently the home stadium of the club. The stadium holds 3,300 spectators and was built in 1933. It has been home to Deportes Iquique since the club's founding, in 1978, until 1993, and from 2016 until at least 2019. The club played at the Estadio Tierra de Campeones between 1994 and 2016, but this stadium is currently undergoing a complete reconstruction.

Players

Current squad

 The teams of the Chilean Primera Division are limited to five players without Chilean nationality and also the same number of foreign players in the field.

2021 Winter transfers

In

Out

Managers
  Ramón Estay (1979–1980)
  Ramón Estay (1987–1988)
  Ramón Estay (1990)
  Ramón Estay (1992)
  Mario Maldonado (1993)
  Ramón Estay (1994)
  Juan Páez (1995)
  Gerardo Pelusso (1996–97)
  Jorge Garcés (1998–99)
  Ramón Estay (2001)
  Ramón Estay (2003)
  Gustavo Huerta (2009–10)
  José Cantillana (2010–11)
  Fernando Vergara (2011)
  Jorge Pellicer (2011–12)
  Christian Díaz (2013)
  Jaime Vera (2013–14)
  Héctor Pinto (2014)
  Nelson Acosta (2014–2015)
  Jaime Vera (2015–2017)
  Erick Guerrero (2017–2018)
  Miguel Riffo (2018)
  Luis Musrri (2018)
  Pablo Sánchez (2018-)

Honours

Domestic
 Copa Chile: 3
1980, 2010, 2013–14
 Segunda División/Primera B: 3
1979, 1997-C, 2010
 Tercera División: 1
2006

South American cups history

References

External links
 Iquique at ANFP official website 
 Official club website 

 
Football clubs in Chile
Iquique
Sport in Tarapacá Region
Association football clubs established in 1978
1978 establishments in Chile